Jerome Jackson may refer to:
Jerome Jackson (producer) (1898–1940), American film producer and script writer
J. J. Jackson (singer) (Jerome Louis Jackson, born 1942), American singer, songwriter and arranger

See also
Jerry Jackson (disambiguation)